Tasmanocoenis is a genus of small squaregilled mayflies in the family Caenidae. There are about seven described species in Tasmanocoenis.

Species
These seven species belong to the genus Tasmanocoenis:
 Tasmanocoenis arcuata Alba-Tercedor & Suter, 1990
 Tasmanocoenis jillongi Harker, 1957
 Tasmanocoenis novaegiuneae van Bruggen, 1957
 Tasmanocoenis queenslandica (Soldán, 1978)
 Tasmanocoenis rieki (Soldán, 1978)
 Tasmanocoenis tillyardi (Lestage, 1938)
 Tasmanocoenis tonnoiri Lestage, 1931

References

Further reading

 
 

Mayflies
Articles created by Qbugbot